Crystal Cave may refer to:

 Crystal Cave, Bermuda
 Crystal Cave (Kentucky)
 Crystal Cave (Ohio)
 Crystal Cave (Pennsylvania)
 Crystal Cave (Sequoia National Park)
 Crystal Cave (Western Australia)
 Crystal Cave (Wisconsin)
 Cave of the Crystals (Cueva de los Cristales), Naica mine, Chihuahua, Mexico
 Crystal Cave in St. Herman's Blue Hole National Park, Belize

Other
 Crystal Caves, video game by Apogee
 The Crystal Cave, 1970 fantasy novel by Mary Stewart

See also
 Crystal Caverns (disambiguation)
 Crystal Cavern
 Crystal Grottoes
 Geode